The 2019/20 FIS Ski Jumping Alpen Cup is the 30th Alpen Cup season in ski jumping for men and the 12th for ladies.

Other competitive circuits this season included the World Cup, Grand Prix, Continental Cup, FIS Cup and FIS Race.

Calendar

Men

Ladies

Mixed team

Standings

Men

Ladies

Ladies' Alpen Cup Tournament

References 

2019 in ski jumping
2020 in ski jumping
FIS Ski Jumping Alpen Cup